Tom Molach is a peak within the Ardgoil Peninsula and Arrochar Alps near Lochgoilhead in Argyll, Scotland.

References

Mountains and hills of Argyll and Bute